The Malaysian United Party (abbreviated MUP) is a small political party registered in 2016 and based in George Town, Penang.

The party's stated intention was to act as a third force in Malaysian politics and assume the role of providing check and balance on both the ruling and opposition parties.

The initial membership of the party consisted of civil society members from the ethnic Chinese community helmed by business owner, Tan Gin Theam, and aided by two former Barisan Nasional politicians, David Yim and Lim Boo Chang.

Leadership

 President ; Tan Gin Theam
 Deputy President ; Dennis Koay Xing Boon
 Vice Presidents ; Lim Boo Chang  Dennis Yim  Soon Chee Beng  Lily Teoh
 Secretary ; Kee Lean Ee
 Treasurer ; Noor Shukri Hashim

General election results
The party contested 20 state seats and five parliamentary seats, all in the state of Penang, in the 2018 Malaysian general election but failed in their maiden electoral venture with all their candidates having lost their deposits.

External links
 Malaysian United Party
 Malaysian United Party on Facebook
 Singapore elections

See also
Politics of Malaysia
List of political parties in Malaysia

References

Political parties established in 2016
Political parties in Malaysia
2016 establishments in Malaysia